Neogirdharia jingdongensis is a moth in the family Crambidae. It was described by Shi-Mei Song and Tie-Mei Chen in 2004. It is found in Jingdong, China.

References

Haimbachiini
Moths described in 2004